The 1976 All-Ireland Minor Hurling Championship was the 46th staging of the All-Ireland Minor Hurling Championship since its establishment by the Gaelic Athletic Association in 1928.

Kilkenny entered the championship as the defending champions.

On 5 September 1976 Tipperary won the championship following a 2-20 to 1-7 defeat of Kilkenny in the All-Ireland final. This was their 13th All-Ireland title and their first title in 17 years.

Results

Semi-final

Final

External links
 All-Ireland Minor Hurling Championship: Roll Of Honour

Minor
All-Ireland Minor Hurling Championship